Semkhor is a 2021 Indian Dimasa-language film directed by Aimee Baruah. This was the first-ever film in the Dimasa language screened as the opening feature film of the Indian Panorama in 2021. The film depicts the life of a village lady, a mother of 14 children.

Synopsis 
A Samsa man named Diro participates in the hangseu bisu in a nearby hamlet, which results in his confinement and eventual death. As a result, Diro's wife is left in charge of raising his three kids alone. She has a variety of events while working as an assistant midwife that she loathes. If a woman dies while she is pregnant, Semkhor tradition dictates that the newborn be buried with the mother alive. At the age of just 11, Diro's widow married Dinar to her one and only daughter, Muri. Sadly, Muri passes away right after giving birth to a girl. How Diro's wife gives Muri's child fresh life in a culture where women aren't even allowed to make decisions is like a sign of a new dawn in Semkhor.

Cast 

 Prateek Hagjer
 Aimee Baruah

Awards

Reception 

 The heroine and her various misfortunes serve as the vehicle via which Aimee Baruah deftly explores a wide range of social and cultural concerns and evils. The visual depiction of the town where the story takes place away from the bustle of city life.

Controversy 

 The Dimasa people said in a letter to the president that the movie had given a distorted account of their rituals, traditions, and way of life. Additionally, the Dimasa organizations pleaded with the president to stop any press coverage of the movie's director, Aimee Baruah.
 Aimee Baruah, the film's director, is the subject of a FIR for allegedly "misrepresenting" Dimasa culture and feeding prejudices against the group.
 At least five Dimasa organizations claim that an infant who was 84 days old died while Aimee Baruah's Semkhor, which has been the subject of intense controversy, was being filmed.

References 

Indian drama films
2021 films
2021 drama films